The great chamber was the second most important room in a medieval or Tudor English castle, palace, mansion, or manor house after the great hall. Medieval great halls were the ceremonial centre of the household and were not private at all; the gentlemen attendants and the servants would come and go all the time. The great chamber was at the dais end of the hall, usually up a staircase. It was the first room which offered the lord of the household some privacy from his own staff, albeit not total privacy. In the Middle Ages the great chamber was an all-purpose reception and living room. The family might take some meals in it, though the great hall was the main eating room. In modest manor houses it sometimes also served as the main bedroom. 

By the seventeenth century communal meals in the hall had been abandoned and the great chamber was the best dining room. There was often a more modest room called the parlour, where the family took its meals when eating alone. Large houses gradually acquired a greater range of specialised living rooms, such as libraries, drawing rooms, and music rooms. By the early 18th century, great chambers had been replaced by rooms called "saloons", and these soon lost their function as dining rooms.

Many great chambers survive. Hardwick Hall has a very large and little-altered example from around 1600. In many other cases they were redecorated and given more specialised functions as drawing rooms or ballrooms or libraries.

Architecture in the United Kingdom
Rooms